David Andrew Cole (born 28 September 1962) is an English former footballer who played for Exeter City, Rochdale, Swansea City, Swindon Town and Torquay United.

References

1962 births
Living people
English footballers
Association football defenders
English Football League players
Footballers from Barnsley
Sunderland A.F.C. players
Swansea City A.F.C. players
Swindon Town F.C. players
Torquay United F.C. players
Rochdale A.F.C. players
Exeter City F.C. players
Merthyr Tydfil F.C. players
Newport County A.F.C. players
Cinderford Town A.F.C. players